John Glaholme Ormston (born 30 October 1909 in West Cornforth - died 22 June 2007) was a Speedway rider who finished runner-up in the Star Riders' Championship in 1935,  the forerunner to the Speedway World Championship. He also competed in the first ever World Final in 1936 (finishing equal fifth).

Having ridden for Middlesbrough, he left in 1929 to become captain of the Wembley Lions team aged twenty one. While riding for Wembley he won the first ever London Riders' Championship at the Crystal Palace as well as the Southern League twice and the London Cup. He won the inaugural National League with Wembley in 1932 and was a member of the England team in the first-ever England v Australia Test Match at Wimbledon Stadium. He rode for England in a total of 13 Test matches against Australia, of which 3 were in Australia in 1937–38.

He subsequently joined Birmingham (Hall Green) in 1934, and then from 1935-38 rode for the Harringay Tigers in London.

Jack was the last surviving competitor from the original World Final before he died aged 97.

World Final Appearances
 1936 -  London, Wembley Stadium - 6th - 17pts
 1938 -  London, Wembley Stadium - 12th - 9pts

After retirement
After jack retired from speedway at the end of the 1938 season he became an established racehorse trainer, with over four hundred winners to his credit before he retired from training in 1976.

Players cigarette cards
Ormston is listed as number 34 of 50 in the 1930s Player's cigarette card collection.

References

External links
 Obituary - Daily Telegraph

1909 births
2007 deaths
British speedway riders
English motorcycle racers
British racehorse trainers
Middlesbrough Bears riders
Wembley Lions riders
Harringay Racers riders
Birmingham Brummies riders
People educated at Barnard Castle School